Jules James, (February 14, 1885 – March 12, 1957), was a career U.S. Naval officer. During World War II he commanded U.S. Naval forces in Bermuda and then later oversaw the construction of a large number of U.S. Navy ships while commanding the Sixth Naval District.

Biography

He was born on 14 February 1885 in Danville, Virginia.

Jules James graduated from the U.S. Naval Academy in 1910 and was commissioned an ensign in the U.S. Navy. One of his early assignments was as a White House naval aide to President Woodrow Wilson from 1912 to 1913. The following year James had his first taste of combat, serving on the  during the Battle of Veracruz. Lieutenant Commander James served as Executive Officer aboard the USS Rochester (CA-2) during World War I as the ship escorted convoys to and from Europe. For his actions Jules was give a special letter of commendation. Later, during the 70th U.S. Congress, special dispensation allowed James to accept the French Legion of Honour for his World War I service.

In 1921 LCDR James and was present at one of the key changing moments in naval history. United States Army General Billy Mitchell, an outspoken advocate for air power, led a series of tests off the Virginia coast in which the ex-German battleship  and other ships were sunk by bomber aircraft. James served as Chief Censor, given responsibility for censoring what information about the tests were released to the news media. After a tour aboard the USS Columbia in 1922, James served as assistant naval attache to the American embassies in France, Spain, and Portugal from 1923 to 1926.

In 1933 James was head of the Department of Ordnance and Gunnery at the U.S. Naval Academy. In 1937 he directed the fitting out of the light cruiser , which he then commanded until mid-1939. From 1939 to 1941, he served as assistant director, and briefly acting director, of the Office of Naval Intelligence. In 1941 he became commander of the newly acquired U.S. Naval Operating Base on Bermuda, where he also commanded the combined U.S. and British local defense forces.

From May 1943 to September 1945, James commanded the Sixth Naval District, headquartered at Charleston Navy Yard, Charleston, South Carolina. In 1945 James received his final assignment, commander of United States Naval Forces, Mediterranean (now redesignated the U.S. Sixth Fleet) where he served until retiring from active duty in 1946.

In addition to being a serving officer, James was an inventor and songwriter. During his time in Bermuda James wrote and published the tune "Traveling High". Earlier in his career he was responsible for the invention of a new type of gunsight for Navy machine guns and a naval mine.

He died on 12 March 1957 in Bethesda, Maryland.

Personal
Jules James was born in Danville, Virginia, where he studied at Danville Military Institute preparatory to entering the U. S. Naval Academy. In 1928 he married Eleanor Standish Gamble, niece of U.S. Secretary of War Henry Stimson. Gamble was also the great-great granddaughter of American founding father Roger Sherman. Following his retirement from the Navy in 1946, James became a special representative in Europe for the National Lead Company.

References

Further reading
Eleanor Gamble James Oral History Interview, 1920s-1950s East Carolina University
USS PHILADELPHIA (CL-41) Navy Source

1885 births
1957 deaths
United States Navy vice admirals
Naval War College alumni
Recipients of the Legion of Honour
People from Danville, Virginia
Military aides to the President of the United States
Directors of the Office of Naval Intelligence
United States Navy personnel of World War I
United States Navy World War II admirals